Impatiens wilsoni is a species of flowering plant in the family Balsaminaceae. It is endemic to China, where it is known only from Sichuan.

This species grows up to half a meter tall. The inflorescence is a raceme of 4 to 10 large, white flowers.

The plant grows in moist, shady habitat, such as forest understory.

Sources

Flora of Sichuan
Endemic flora of China
wilsoni
Endangered plants
Taxonomy articles created by Polbot